

2016–17 NCAA football bowl games
 December 17, 2016 – January 9, 2017: 2016–17 NCAA football bowl games Schedule

College Football Playoff (CFP) and Championship Game
 December 30, 2016: 2016 Orange Bowl in Miami Gardens, Florida at the Hard Rock Stadium
 The Florida State Seminoles defeated the Michigan Wolverines, 33–32.
 December 31, 2016: 2016 Peach Bowl in Atlanta at the Georgia Dome
 The Alabama Crimson Tide defeated the Washington Huskies, 24–7.
 December 31, 2016: 2016 Fiesta Bowl in Glendale, Arizona at the University of Phoenix Stadium
 The Clemson Tigers defeated the Ohio State Buckeyes, 31–0.
 January 2, 2017: 2017 Cotton Bowl Classic in Arlington at the AT&T Stadium
 The Wisconsin Badgers defeated the Western Michigan Broncos, 24–16.
 January 2, 2017: 2017 Rose Bowl in Pasadena at the Rose Bowl
 The USC Trojans defeated the Penn State Nittany Lions, 52–49.
 January 2, 2017: 2017 Sugar Bowl in New Orleans at the Mercedes-Benz Superdome
 The Oklahoma Sooners defeated the Auburn Tigers, 35–13.
 January 9, 2017: 2017 College Football Playoff National Championship in Tampa at the Raymond James Stadium
 The Clemson Tigers defeated the Alabama Crimson Tide, 35–31.

Non-CFP bowl games
 December 17, 2016: 2016 New Mexico Bowl in Albuquerque at the University Stadium
 The New Mexico Lobos defeated the UTSA Roadrunners, 23–20.
 December 17, 2016: 2016 Las Vegas Bowl in Las Vegas at the Sam Boyd Stadium
 The San Diego State Aztecs defeated the Houston Cougars, 34–10.
 December 17, 2016: 2016 Camellia Bowl in Montgomery at the Cramton Bowl
 The Appalachian State Mountaineers defeated the Toledo Rockets, 31–28.
 December 17, 2016: 2016 Cure Bowl in Orlando at the Camping World Stadium
 The Arkansas State Red Wolves defeated the UCF Knights, 31–13.
 December 17, 2016: 2016 New Orleans Bowl in New Orleans at the Mercedes-Benz Superdome
 The Southern Miss Golden Eagles defeated the Louisiana–Lafayette Ragin' Cajuns, 28–21.
 December 19, 2016: 2016 Miami Beach Bowl in Miami at Marlins Park
 The Tulsa Golden Hurricane defeated the Central Michigan Chippewas, 55–10.
 December 20, 2016: 2016 Boca Raton Bowl in Boca Raton at the FAU Stadium
 The Western Kentucky Hilltoppers defeated the Memphis Tigers, 51–31.
 December 21, 2016: 2016 Poinsettia Bowl in San Diego at the Qualcomm Stadium
 The BYU Cougars defeated the Wyoming Cowboys, 24–21.
 December 22, 2016: 2016 Famous Idaho Potato Bowl in Boise at the Albertsons Stadium
 The Idaho Vandals defeated the Colorado State Rams, 61–50.
 December 23, 2016: 2016 Bahamas Bowl in Nassau at the Thomas Robinson Stadium
 The Old Dominion Monarchs defeated the Eastern Michigan Eagles, 24–20.
 December 23, 2016: 2016 Armed Forces Bowl in Fort Worth at the Amon G. Carter Stadium
 The Louisiana Tech Bulldogs defeated the Navy Midshipmen, 48–45.
 December 23, 2016: 2016 Dollar General Bowl in Mobile at the Ladd–Peebles Stadium
 The Troy Trojans defeated the Ohio Bobcats, 28–23.
 December 24, 2016: 2016 Hawaii Bowl in Honolulu at the Aloha Stadium
 The Hawaii Rainbow Warriors defeated the Middle Tennessee Blue Raiders, 52–35.
 December 26, 2016: 2016 St. Petersburg Bowl in St. Petersburg at Tropicana Field
 The Mississippi State Bulldogs defeated the Miami RedHawks, 17–16.
 December 26, 2016: 2016 Quick Lane Bowl in Detroit at Ford Field
 The Boston College Eagles defeated the Maryland Terrapins, 36–30.
 December 26, 2016: 2016 Independence Bowl in Shreveport at the Independence Stadium
 The NC State Wolfpack defeated the Vanderbilt Commodores, 41–17.
 December 27, 2016: 2016 Heart of Dallas Bowl in Dallas at the Cotton Bowl
 The Army Black Knights defeated the North Texas Mean Green, 38–31.
 December 27, 2016: 2016 Military Bowl in Annapolis at the Navy–Marine Corps Memorial Stadium
 The Wake Forest Demon Deacons defeated the Temple Owls, 34–26.
 December 27, 2016: 2016 Holiday Bowl in San Diego at Qualcomm Stadium
 The Minnesota Golden Gophers defeated the Washington State Cougars, 17–12.
 December 27, 2016: 2016 Cactus Bowl in Phoenix at Chase Field
 The Baylor Bears defeated the Boise State Broncos, 31–12.
 December 28, 2016: 2016 Pinstripe Bowl in The Bronx (New York City) at Yankee Stadium
 The Northwestern Wildcats defeated the Pittsburgh Panthers, 31–24.
 December 28, 2016: 2016 Russell Athletic Bowl in Orlando at the Camping World Stadium
 The Miami Hurricanes defeated the West Virginia Mountaineers, 31–14.
 December 28, 2016: 2016 Foster Farms Bowl in Santa Clara at Levi's Stadium
 The Utah Utes defeated the Indiana Hoosiers, 26–24.
 December 28, 2016: 2016 Texas Bowl in Houston at NRG Stadium
 The Kansas State Wildcats defeated the Texas A&M Aggies, 33–28.
 December 29, 2016: 2016 Birmingham Bowl in Birmingham at Legion Field
 The South Florida Bulls defeated the South Carolina Gamecocks, 46–39.
 December 29, 2016: 2016 Belk Bowl in Charlotte at the Bank of America Stadium
 The Virginia Tech Hokies defeated the Arkansas Razorbacks, 35–24.
 December 29, 2016: 2016 Alamo Bowl in San Antonio at the Alamodome
 The Oklahoma State Cowboys defeated the Colorado Buffaloes, 38–8.
 December 30, 2016: 2016 Liberty Bowl in Memphis at the Liberty Bowl Memorial Stadium
 The Georgia Bulldogs defeated the TCU Horned Frogs, 31–23.
 December 30, 2016: 2016 Sun Bowl in El Paso at the Sun Bowl
 The Stanford Cardinal defeated the North Carolina Tar Heels, 25–23.
 December 30, 2016: 2016 Music City Bowl in Nashville at Nissan Stadium
 The Tennessee Volunteers defeated the Nebraska Cornhuskers, 38–24.
 December 30, 2016: 2016 Arizona Bowl in Tucson at Arizona Stadium
 The Air Force Falcons defeated the South Alabama Jaguars, 45–21.
 December 31, 2016: 2016 Citrus Bowl in Orlando at the Camping World Stadium
 The LSU Tigers defeated the Louisville Cardinals, 29–9.
 December 31, 2016: 2016 TaxSlayer Bowl in Jacksonville at EverBank Field
 The Georgia Tech Yellow Jackets defeated the Kentucky Wildcats, 33–18.
 January 2, 2017: 2017 Outback Bowl in Tampa at the Raymond James Stadium
 The Florida Gators defeated the Iowa Hawkeyes, 30–3.

National Football League
 January 29: 2017 Pro Bowl in Orlando at Camping World Stadium
 The AFC defeated the NFC, 20–13.
 Offensive MVP: Travis Kelce (Kansas City Chiefs)
 Defensive MVP: Lorenzo Alexander (Buffalo Bills)
 February 5: Super Bowl LI in Houston at NRG Stadium
 The New England Patriots defeated the Atlanta Falcons, 34–28 in overtime, to win their fifth Super Bowl title.
 MVP: Tom Brady (New England Patriots)
 April 27 – 29: 2017 NFL Draft in Philadelphia
 #1 pick: Myles Garrett (to the Cleveland Browns from the Texas A&M Aggies)
 September 7 – December 31: 2017 NFL season

IFAF
 June 24 – 30: 2017 IFAF Women's World Championship in Langley, British Columbia
 The  defeated , 41–16, to win their third consecutive IFAF Women's World Championship title.
  took third place.
 November 2 – 5: 2017 IFAF Beach Football World Championship in Tamarindo (debut event)
 Event was cancelled.

Pro Football Hall of Fame
Class of 2017:
Morten Andersen, player 
Terrell Davis, player
Kenny Easley, player
Jerry Jones, player
Jason Taylor, player
LaDainian Tomlinson, player
Kurt Warner, player

References

External links
 National Football League
 International Federation of American Football